Quenemo is a city in Osage County, Kansas, United States, along the Marais des Cygnes River.  As of the 2020 census, the population of the city was 288.

History
Quenemo was laid out about 1870. Quenemo was the name of a Sac and Fox Indian chief. A fire in 1878 destroyed much of the town. Quenemo experienced rapid growth in 1884 after the AT&SF railroad was built through it.

Geography
Quenemo is located at  (38.580413, -95.527895).

Climate
The climate in this area is characterized by hot, humid summers and generally mild to cool winters.  According to the Köppen Climate Classification system, Quenemo has a humid subtropical climate, abbreviated "Cfa" on climate maps.

Demographics

Quenemo is part of the Topeka, Kansas Metropolitan Statistical Area.

2010 census
As of the census of 2010, there were 388 people, 139 households, and 90 families residing in the city. The racial makeup of the city was 93.3% White, 1.3% African American, 2.6% Native American, 0.3% from other races, and 2.6% from two or more races. Hispanic or Latino of any race were 1.8% of the population.

There were 139 households, of which 39.6% had children under the age of 18 living with them, 44.6% were married couples living together, 9.4% had a female householder with no husband present, 10.8% had a male householder with no wife present, and 35.3% were non-families. 25.9% of all households were made up of individuals, and 7.2% had someone living alone who was 65 years of age or older. The average household size was 2.79 and the average family size was 3.44.

The median age in the city was 32.3 years. 31.7% of residents were under the age of 18; 9.3% were between the ages of 18 and 24; 23.2% were from 25 to 44; 28.4% were from 45 to 64; and 7.5% were 65 years of age or older. The gender makeup of the city was 54.1% male and 45.9% female.

2000 census
As of the census of 2000, there were 468 people, 169 households, and 128 families residing in the city. The racial makeup of the city was 93.16% White, 0.21% African American, 2.99% Native American, and 3.63% from two or more races. Hispanic or Latino of any race were 0.43% of the population.

There were 169 households, out of which 42.0% had children under the age of 18 living with them, 56.8% were married couples living together, 16.0% had a female householder with no husband present, and 23.7% were non-families. 21.3% of all households were made up of individuals, and 5.3% had someone living alone who was 65 years of age or older. The average household size was 2.77 and the average family size was 3.16.

In the city, the population was spread out, with 34.0% under the age of 18, 7.1% from 18 to 24, 29.7% from 25 to 44, 20.7% from 45 to 64, and 8.5% who were 65 years of age or older. The median age was 31 years. For every 100 females, there were 100.9 males. For every 100 females age 18 and over, there were 103.3 males.

The median income for a household in the city was $25,000, and the median income for a family was $28,854. Males had a median income of $27,019 versus $14,375 for females. The per capita income for the city was $9,943. About 19.4% of families and 24.0% of the population were below the poverty line, including 30.1% of those under the age of 18 and none of those aged 65 or over.

Education
The community is served by Marais des Cygnes Valley USD 456 public school district.  The district high school is Marais des Cygnes Valley High School. Mascot is Trojans.

Prior to school unification, the Quenemo High School Buffaloes won the Kansas State High School boys class BB basketball championship in 1960.

Parks and Recreation
 Pomona State Park

References

Further reading

External links
 Quenemo - Directory of Public Officials
 Quenemo city map, KDOT

Cities in Osage County, Kansas
Cities in Kansas
Topeka metropolitan area, Kansas